The Hooten Hallers are an American blues/ rock'n'roll band that formed in Columbia, Missouri in 2007.

History
The band was founded by guitarist/lead vocalist John Randall and drummer/ falsetto vocalist Andy Rehm, who performed as a duo and were known for their raucous and often improvised live performances.  Paul Weber briefly joined the band in 2013–14 on harmonica and tuba, and wrote several of the group's songs, such as "She Used to Love My Music" and "Trouble Is".  Baritone and bass saxophonist Kellie Everett joined in 2014 and solidified the group's line-up as a trio.  The Hooten Hallers are a "high-energy blues, soul and rock and roll band known for their gritty Americana roots music".

After a number of self-released albums, the Hooten Hallers signed with Big Muddy Records in 2012, releasing their album "Greetings From Welp City!" which featured harmonica work by Ryan Koenig of Pokey LaFarge. The full length follow-up album "Chillicothe Fireball" was released in 2014 on Big Muddy Records, and features performances by Paul Weber and Kellie Everett.  The group embarked on their first European tour in 2015 with Joe Buck (Musician) and Viva Le Vox, performing in Belgium, Germany, The Netherlands, Sweden, Norway, Denmark, Switzerland, France, and Spain.  The acoustic EP "Mountain of Pain" was released on Big Muddy Records in 2016, and was an intentional departure from the band's sound, adding acoustic guitar, upright bass, fiddle, and piano to the mix.

The band's self-titled studio album, "The Hooten Hallers", came out on April 21, 2017 on Big Muddy Records.  Vices Noisey called it "an exciting mix of blues, punk, and folk". The self-titled album was co-produced by Johnny Walker (Dr. John Wirick) of the Soledad Brothers (band) and Kristo Baricevic.  No Depression writes that the music "evokes images of Tom Waits tending to a trotline at Lake of the Ozarks." The album charted at #24 on The Roots Music Report's Top 50 Americana Country Album Chart for the Week of May 27, 2017.

In Dec 2018, The Hooten Hallers released a live album entitled "Live in Missouri", recorded at The Blue Note in Columbia, MO on May 12, 2018.

On Sept 9, 2022, the band's latest full length studio album 'Back in Business Again' was released, along with two accompanying music videos for 'Back in Business Again' and 'Cat Scrap'. It was recorded in St Louis, MO at Native Sound Studios in December of 2019 and produced by Dominic Davis. Aarik Danielsen of the Columbia Daily Tribune writes, "The band's gleefully gritty sound never misses the mark, and their clear willingness to explore its every dimension ensures The Hooten Hallers' continued sway over anyone within earshot".

Tours

The band has toured or performed with acts such as The Dead South, Reverend Horton Heat, Pokey LaFarge, Legendary Shack Shakers, Possessed by Paul James, JD Wilkes & the Dirt Daubers, T Model Ford, The Reverend Peyton's Big Damn Band, Scott H. Biram, Split Lip Rayfield, Left Lane Cruiser, Black Diamond Heavies, Larry and His Flask, Unknown Hinson, and many others.

They have performed at a number of festivals in North America and Europe, including Winnipeg Folk Festival, Muddy Roots Music Festival, 80/35 Music Festival, the Roots N Blues Festival, SXSW, Rotterdam Bluegrass Festival, Festival International de Louisiane, Deep Blues Festival, Long Beach Folk Revival Festival, Wildwood Music Festival, Muddy Roots Europe, and Mile of Music Festival.

Discography

References

Punk blues musical groups
American blues musical groups
Musical groups from Columbia, Missouri
Rock music groups from Missouri
Rock and roll music groups
Musical groups from St. Louis
Musical groups established in 2007
2007 establishments in Missouri